Rhacophorus modestus is a species of frog in the family Rhacophoridae endemic to Sumatra, Indonesia. Its common name is Boulenger's flying frog. It is only known from the type series collected from a montane forest on the Mount Kerinci, within the Kerinci Seblat National Park. Habitat loss is occurring on the lower slopes of the mountain.

References

modestus
Amphibians of Indonesia
Endemic fauna of Indonesia
Fauna of Sumatra
Taxonomy articles created by Polbot
Amphibians described in 1920